Bougainvillea glabra, the lesser bougainvillea or paperflower, is the most common species of bougainvillea used for bonsai. The epithet 'glabra' comes from Latin and means "bald".

Description 
It is an evergreen, climbing shrub with thick, thorny stems and drooping branches that are glabrous or sparsely hairy. The leaves have a  stem. The leaf blade is ovate to ovate-lanceolate, pointed or briefly pointed, 5 to 13 centimeters long and 3 to 6 centimeters wide, sparsely fluffy hairy on the underside and bald on the top. They tower over the flowers. These grow individually in pairs or in groups of three on flower stems about 3.5 millimeters long.

The crown tube is greenish, clearly angled, about 2 centimeters long, sparsely downy hairy, ribbed and points away from the flower stalk. The tip is lobed five times and forms a short, spread, white or yellowish hem. The six to eight stamens have 8 to 13 millimeter long stamens. The ovary is about 2 millimeters long, the stylus 1 millimeter and the scar 2.5 millimeters.

Tiny white flowers usually appear in clusters surrounded by colorful papery bracts, hence the name paperflower. The flowers are about 0.4 cm in diameter (the pink petal-like structures are not petals, but bracts.)

Cultivation
B. glabra is heat and drought tolerant and frost sensitive. It is easily propagated by cuttings. It needs full sunlight, warm weather and well drained soil to flower well. The species is often used in culture, in areas with frost in glass houses, otherwise outdoors. The similar Bougainvillea spectabilis, which differs from Bougainvillea glabra by the velvety-felty underside of the leaves, is also cultivated, but less frequently.

Uses
Being of medical importance, the infusion of the plant's tender leaves and bracts is used orally to treat gastrointestinal problems (diarrhoea, stomach pain), and respiratory conditions (asthma, bronchitis, catarrh, chest pain, fever, pneumonia, whooping cough).

Gallery

See also
Glendora bougainvillea

References 

Nyctaginaceae
Flora of Brazil
Garden plants of South America
Plants used in bonsai
Vines
Taxa named by Jacques Denys Choisy